Going Bananas is a live-action superhero/comedy television series that aired from September 15 to December 1, 1984 on NBC. The series was produced by Hanna-Barbera.

Plot
Roxana Banana is an orangutan that escaped from the zoo and was adopted by the Cole family. One night, a mysterious spaceship comes down from the sky and endows Roxana with super powers via a lightning bolt. Roxana is pursued by two crooks who want to use her super powers for their own ill will, but Roxana's outdodging them by means of her powers, as well as the predicaments she creates for the Coles, provide much of the comedy for this series.

Show add-ons
Also included was "Jungle Jukebox", a takeoff on the then-popular music videos using popular songs with animals in the visuals, as well as parodies of then-current TV shows and commercials using animals.

Cast
James Avery as Hank
Marie Denn as Gran
Emily Moultrie as Louise Cole
Bill Saluga as Hubert
Tim Topper as Jamie Cole
Lynnanne Zager as Delivery Girl

References

External links

NBC original programming
1984 American television series debuts
1984 American television series endings
1980s American children's comedy television series
American superhero comedy television series
Television series by Hanna-Barbera